Amity was a 36-gun fourth rate vessel of the Commonwealth of England. She was purchased by Parliament on 18 January 1650 (after being hired in November 1649) and renamed. She was commissioned into the Parliamentary Naval Force as Amity. During the First Anglo-Dutch War she partook in the Battle of Portland and the Battle of The Gabbard. She was incorporated into the English Navy after the Restoration in May 1660. During the Second Anglo-Dutch War she participated in the Battle of Lowestoft, the Four Days' Battle and the St James Day Fight. She was sold on 27 November 1667.

Amity was the first named vessel in the English or Royal Navy.

Specifications
She was purchased by Parliament on 18 January 1650 (after being hired in November 1649) and renamed. Her builder's measure tonnage was calculated as  tons.

Her gun armament in 1650 was 36 guns. In 1666 her armament was 38 (wartime)/30 (peacetime) and consisted of twelve culverins, fourteen demi-culverins, twelve sakers. Her manning was 150 personnel and rose to 140/120/100 personnel.

Commissioned Service

Service in the English Civil War and Commonwealth Navy
She was commissioned into the Parliamentary Navy in 1650 under the command of Captain John Coppin for Scottish Waters. In 1651 she was under Captain Michael Packe (later Rear-Admiral) with Ayscue in the West Indies. She was in action on 16 August 1652 during which Captain Michael Packe was mortally wounded. Later in 1653 she was under the command of Captain Henry Packe.

First Anglo-Dutch War
During the First Anglo-Dutch War she partook in the Battle of Portland on 18 February 1653 as a member of Robert Blake's Fleet. As a member of Blue Squadron, Rear Division she took part in the Battle of the Gabbard on 2–3 June 1653. In February 1654 she took a 20-gun Dutch ship.

She then sailed with Robert Blake's Fleet to the Mediterranean in 1654. She was at Tunis for the Battle of Porto Farina on 4 April 1655. She remained with Robert Blake's Fleet until 1657.

Service after the Restoration May 1660
Captain John Stoakes was in command from 20 December 1660 to 26 December 1661. Captain John Parker took command on 23 May 1664 and held command until 9 June 1666.

Second Anglo-Dutch War
She was at the Battle of Lowestoft as a member of Red Squadron, Rear Division on 3 June 1665. She arrived with Prince Rupert's Squadron at the Four Days' Battle on 4 June 1666 as a member of the Rear Division. She suffered two killed and 2 wounded. She was at the St James Day Battle as a member of Blue Squadron, Center Division on 25 July 1666. On 28 July 1666 she was under Captain Stephen Pyend until 6 November 1667.

Disposition
Amity was sold on 27 November 1667.

Notes

Citations

References

 British Warships in the Age of Sail (1603 – 1714), by Rif Winfield, published by Seaforth Publishing, England © Rif Winfield 2009, EPUB :
 Fleet Actions, 1.5 Battle off Portland (the Three Days' Battle)
 Fleet Actions, 1.7 Battle of the Gabbard (North Foreland)
 Fleet Actions, 2.1 Battle of Porto Farina (Tunisia)
 Fleet Actions, 3.1 Battle of Lowestoft
 Fleet Actions, 3.3 Battle of the Galloper Sand ('the Four Days' Battle')
 Fleet Actions, 3.4 Battle of Orfordness (the St James Day Battle)
 Chapter 4 Fourth Rates - 'Small Ships', Vessels acquired from 25 March 1603, Purchased Vessel (1650), Amity
 Ships of the Royal Navy, by J.J. Colledge, revised and updated by Lt-Cdr Ben Warlow and Steve Bush, published by Seaforth Publishing, Barnsley, Great Britain, © the estate of J.J. Colledge, Ben Warlow and Steve Bush 2020, EPUB , Section A (Amity)
 The Arming and Fitting of English Ships of War 1800 - 1815, by Brian Lavery, published by US Naval Institute Press © Brian Lavery 1989, Part V Guns, Type of Guns

Ships of the line of the Royal Navy
1650s ships
Ships of the English navy